Ragdale is the former summer retreat of Chicago architect Howard Van Doren Shaw (1869–1926), located in Lake Forest, Illinois. It is also the home of the Ragdale Foundation, an artist residency program that hosts creators from a number of disciplines: nonfiction and fiction writers, composers, poets, play- and screenwriters, visual artists, choreographers, as well as those from interdisciplinary interests.

The house and barn 
Built in 1897, the house and barn were built in Shaw's typical Arts and Crafts manner.

The property underwent another change in 1912 as the Ragdale Ring was installed; at the outdoor theatre, Shaw's family and friends frequently performed Frances Shaw's works for the Lake Forest community, in the 1930s. Benches were incorporated to accommodate over 200 audience members.

Ragdale was also where Sylvia Shaw Judson (1897–1978), Howard's daughter, sculpted her piece Bird Girl, which is prominently featured on the cover of John Berendt's best-selling nonfiction book Midnight in the Garden of Good and Evil. In 1943, the Meadow Studio was built on the prairie in an effort to accommodate Sylvia's work as a sculptor; in fact, it was here that she formed the Bird Girl as well as a number of other well-known pieces, such as Cats and Summer.

The Ragdale Foundation 
In 1976 Shaw's granddaughter, poet Alice Judson Hayes (1922–2006), founded The Ragdale Foundation as a non-profit aimed at providing a place of rest and relaxation for artists of all disciplines.

Initially, Hayes ran the foundation with little assistance, managing the landscaping, cooking, and facilities on her own.

In 1980, the Ragdale Foundation was able to obtain the Ragdale Barnhouse from the Preston Family, who had purchased it from Shaw's youngest daughter, Theodora, in the late 1940s, then remodeled it in the 1950s. It is within this converted barn that the Foundation offices are housed.

1991 marked itself as yet another year of progress as the Friends' Studio was built. The space provided a workroom to choreographers, visual artists, composers, and performance artists. Additionally, its well-lit area provided a perfect place for exhibitions and performances.

In 2006, the Ragdale Foundation both celebrated its 30th anniversary and mourned the death of Alice Judson Hayes.

On April 9, 2008, the Meadow Studio was reopened, after having been the workspace of Sylvia Shaw Judson. Partnering with 12 fourth- and fifth-year students from the Illinois Institute of Technology College of Architecture under the direction of Associate Professor Frank Flurry, the Foundation was able to utilize the original footprint of the building in constructing a building light on environmental impact. Due to poor roof maintenance in the studio's early years, it was subject to extensive damage—however, the Ragdale Foundation was fortunate in attaining the funds necessary to rebuild it.

Notable alumni

References

External links
 The Ragdale Foundation (Official Website)
 Lake Forest's Ragdale offers historic and quiet retreat
 The View from Ragdale: An Ideal Retreat for Artists
 Ragdale - A Historic Landscape Revisited

American artist groups and collectives
Artist colonies
Non-profit organizations based in Illinois
Arts and Crafts architecture in Illinois
Houses on the National Register of Historic Places in Illinois
National Register of Historic Places in Lake County, Illinois
Houses in Lake County, Illinois
Houses completed in 1897
Organizations established in 1976
Howard Van Doren Shaw buildings